Campo Arenal Aerodrome is an airport in Campo Arenal in the Catamarca Province of Argentina. It was built in 1995, by mining company Minera La Alumbrera. It has many regular flights operated by American Jet, flying small aircraft bringing workers from larger cities.

Airlines

References

External links
 American Jet s.a. (English or Spanish)
 Minera La Alumbrera YMAD (Spanish only)

Airports in Catamarca Province